Barlai railway station is a railway station on Indore–Gwalior line under the Ratlam railway division of Western Railway zone. This is situated at Barlai Jagir in Indore district of the Indian state of Madhya Pradesh.

References

Railway stations in Indore district
Ratlam railway division